Liana Gabriela Smărăndache Badea (born ) is a Romanian female volleyball player, playing as a middle-blocker. She is part of the Romania women's national volleyball team.

She competed at the 2015 European Games in Baku and at the 2015 Women's European Volleyball Championship. 
On club level she played for Dinamo București in 2015.

References

1989 births
Living people
Romanian women's volleyball players
Place of birth missing (living people)
European Games competitors for Romania
Volleyball players at the 2015 European Games